The Sarasota Police Department is a full-service law enforcement agency for Sarasota, Florida. It provides police services to 59,000 residents. The Sarasota Police Department operates on a budget of $26,902,601 (2011–2012) with approximately 179 sworn and approximately 65 un-sworn personnel and volunteers.

Departments

Chief of Police 
Currently, there is an Interim Chief of Police of the Sarasota Police Department.  Interim Chief Rex Troche was selected as Interim Chief in August 2021.  The Chief of Police is the executive officer of the Sarasota Police Department and is ultimately responsible for decisions regarding policy, enforcement, and use of resources in conjunction with the City Manager and the City Commission.

Criminal Investigations Division (CID) 

The primary function of the Criminal Investigation Division is to conduct follow-up investigations of reported crimes.  These investigations consist of interviewing suspects, victims and witnesses; analyzing information for validity, reliability and accuracy and compiling a comprehensive and factual case file to be presented in court.

Support Services Division 

The Support Services Division oversees Training, Background and Recruitment, Property and Evidence, Records, MIS (Management Information Systems), Alarms, Payroll and Personnel, Fiscal and Administration, Fleet, Red Light Camera Program, School Crossing Guards and Quartermaster.

Patrol Division 

The Patrol Division is commanded by one Captain and one Deputy Commander who holds the rank of Lieutenant.   Uniform Patrol Operations, Special Response Units, Crime Prevention and the Sarasota P.D. Volunteer Program are under the Bureau of Patrol Operations.

Stations 
The station main police is located at 2099 Adams Lane Sarasota, Florida 34237  All civilian employees and sworn personnel operate from this station.

Equipment

Vehicles
The department currently owns two Yellowfin boats to provide service to those in Sarasota Bay. The traffic unit has 4 Harley-Davidson police motorcycles, and each traffic officer is provided with a patrol car. The department uses Chevrolet Impala police model and Chevy Tahoe police model.

Firearms
The department issues Glock 22, .40 caliber handguns to all sworn officers.

Ranks

Line of duty Deaths 
One local officer has died in the line of duty.

See also

List of U.S. state and local law enforcement agencies

References

External links
 
 

Sarasota, Florida
Municipal police departments of Florida